Magnor may refer to:

People
Horst-Rüdiger Magnor (1942-2008), a German racewalker
Ole Magnor (born 1998), a Norwegian mixed martial arts fighter

Places
Magnor, a village in the municipality of Eidskog in Innlandet county, Norway
Magnor Church, a church in the municipality of Eidskog in Innlandet county, Norway

Other
Magnor Glassverk, a glass production company in the municipality of Eidskog in Innlandet county, Norway
Magnor (band), a band
The Mighty Magnor, a comic book series